Ijnisinya (‘Ijnisinyâ) is a Palestinian village located six kilometres northwest of Nablus in the Nablus Governorate. Most of the working-age inhabitants live as farmers or governmental workers. It has a population of about 800. Ijnisinya is governed by a village council.

History
Sherds from Iron Age I, Iron Age II and the Persian eras have been found here.

The Roman Empress Helena of Constantinople who temporarily resided in nearby Sebastia used to swim in the lake in Ijinsinya with her maids. The area at the time was a small lake surrounded by gardens. Men were forbidden from entering the area by Empress Helena in order to guarantee her and her maids' privacy. The name Ijnisinya derives from Greek, translating as "the Eden of women" reflecting the original use of the village site.

Roman remains
There is an Ancient Roman building named Sheikh Shu'la that lies atop a hill overlooking three villages, including Ijnisinya as well as, Sebastia, and an-Naqura. The building is originally said to be a Roman monastery seven floors high. The remains of the monastery include stone closets, a prison, galleys, secret passageways, and several wells. Its name, Shu'leh is one of a number of Arabic words meaning "fire". The building was named thus because the Ayyubid sultan Saladin used it and similar buildings to transmit messages using fire.

The Romans used some of the village lands for a cemetery after Christianity became the Roman Empire's official religion. It is popular belief that these graves contain treasures. The graves are generally referred to as "Christian graves", or Khallet Issa. Byzantine ceramics have been found in the area, as well as ceramic remains from the early Islamic and Medieval eras.

Medieval period
Ijinsinya's mosque dates back to the days of Umar ibn al-Khattab and is currently part of the village school. Ijnisinya was among a number of Christian villages settled by Crusaders in the area of Nablus and Sebastia during the 12th century.

Ottoman era
In 1596, it appeared in Ottoman tax registers as "Jinisina", a village in the nahiya of Jabal Sami in the liwa of Nablus. It had a population of 8 households and 4 bachelors, all Muslim, and paid taxes on wheat, barley, summer crops, olive trees, goats and beehives, occasional revenues, a press for olives or grapes; a total of 8,434  akçe. 13/24 of the revenue went to a Waqf; Halil ar-Rahman.

In 1667, during Ottoman rule, Ijnisinya appeared in the list of Greek Orthodox parochial churches. However, by 1838 the village no longer possessed a church, although there were still around 60 Christian residents. 
The same year Robinson placed  'Ijnisnia in the Wady esh-Sha'ir district, west of Nablus.

In 1863 Victor Guérin found a small village, with both Muslim and Christians villagers.  In 1882, the PEF's Survey of Western Palestine described  it as "a small hamlet in a valley, with olives around it."

Before the 20th century,  many of the village's residents were Christians, but following disagreements with its Muslim residents, they emigrated to villages with large Christian populations, particularly Zababdeh near Jenin and Bir Zeit near Ramallah.

British Mandate era
In the  1922 census of Palestine, conducted by the British Mandate authorities, Jenesenia had 119 residents, all Muslims,  increasing in the 1931 census  to 157, still all Muslim,  in a total of  30 houses.

In the 1945 statistics the population was 200, all Muslims, with a total land area of 6,547.
Of this, 907 dunams were plantations and irrigable land, 3,216 used for cereals, while 30 dunams were built-up land.

Jordanian era
In the wake of the 1948 Arab–Israeli War Ijnisinya  came  under Jordanian rule.

In 1961, the population was  239.

Post-1967
Since the Six-Day War in 1967, Ijnisinya has been under Israeli occupation, the same year the population was 256.

In a 1997 census by the Palestinian Central Bureau of Statistics (PCBS), there were 418 inhabitants, of which 70 (16.7%) were refugees. The gender distribution was exactly even; 50% were males and 50% were females. According to the PCBS, Ijnisinya had a population of 505 inhabitants in 2007.

Geography

Ijnisinya is located six kilometers northwest of Nablus. It is adjacently east of Sebastia, northeast of an-Naqura, south of Beit Imrin, north of Zawata, west of Asira Al-Shamaliya Ijnisinya has an elevation of 460 meters above sea level.

It has a total land area of 6,547 dunams, of which around two-thirds is cultivable. Its built-up area consists of only 30 dunams, olive trees cover 900 dunams, while cereals make-up the majority of the remaining cultivable land.

On August 4, 2001, Israeli forces burned over 200 olive trees belonging to Ijnisinya and Zawata.

Water supply
Underneath the village mosque is a wide Roman reservoir for underground water which, until recently, was still used by the residents of the village as a water source. Empress Helena built an aqueduct to carry water from Ijnisinya to Sebastia but it fell into ruin during a drought in Palestine. The aqueduct is named after her, and it starts from Nablus and passes through Ein Beit al-Ma', Ijnisinya, and then to Sebastia.

In 2007, the village pump—constructed in 1977—broke down and the village residents were without water, forced to travel to Asira al-Qibliya to borrow water from that village's pump. A few months later, the Ijnisinya Village Council with the help of the American Near East Refugee Aid, constructed a new pump.

References

Bibliography

 
 

 

 

Perlmann, Joel: The 1967 Census of the West Bank and Gaza Strip: A Digitized Version. Annandale-on-Hudson, N.Y.: Levy Economics Institute of Bard College. November 2011 – February 2012. [Digitized from: Israel Central Bureau of Statistics, Census of Population and Housing, 1967 Conducted in the Areas Administered by the IDF, Vols. 1–5 (1967–70), and Census of Population and Housing: East Jerusalem, Parts 1 and 2 (1968–70).]

External links
Welcome To Ijnisinya
Survey of Western Palestine, Map 11:     IAA, Wikimedia commons 
Ijnisinya (aerial photo), Applied Research Institute–Jerusalem, ARIJ
Development Priorities and Needs in Ijnisinya ARIJ

Villages in the West Bank
Towns in Nablus Governorate
Municipalities of the State of Palestine